A list of films produced in the United Kingdom in 1963 (see 1963 in film):

1963

See also
1963 in British music
1963 in British radio
1963 in British television
1963 in the United Kingdom

References

External links

1963
Films
British